Prayssac is a commune in the Lot department in south-western France.

Population

Notable people
Birthplace of Jean-Baptiste Bessières, Duke of Istrie

See also
Communes of the Lot department

References

Communes of Lot (department)
Quercy